The discography of American alternative rock band The Innocence Mission consists of twelve studio albums, two compilation album, two releases issued for free download, five EPs, seventeen singles, ten music videos, and numerous appearances on soundtrack, tribute and sampler albums. The band have had their songs included on over a hundred different compilations and soundtracks, with many of those including the same select few songs (namely "Bright as Yellow", "The Lakes of Canada", "Tomorrow on the Runway" and "What a Wonderful World"). Therefore, only compilations and soundtracks which featured exclusive or otherwise rare content have been included. Also included on this list are their various solo albums and collaborations with other recording artists.

Albums

Studio albums

Compilations

Solo albums

 = Mike Bitts and Steve Brown
 = Don Peris
 = Karen Peris

EPs

Singles

Promotional singles

B-sides

Internet-only releases

Soundtracks and miscellaneous

Collaborations and guest appearances
The band have collaborated on numerous songs recorded by other artists throughout their career, including:
 "I Belong" on Crack the Sky (1987) by Mylon LeFevre & Broken Heart 
 "Shadows" on Lead Me On (1988) by Amy Grant 
 "Hard Sun" on Big Harvest (1989) by Indio 
 "Through Your Hands" on Stolen Moments (1990) by John Hiatt 
 "Don't Face the World Alone" on Brave Heart (1991) by Kim Hill 
 "Cherokee Louise" on Night Ride Home (1991) by Joni Mitchell 
 "Running Away" on From Strength to Strength (1991) by Peter Himmelman 
 "By Way of Sorrow" on Blue Pony (1997) by Julie Miller 
 "Constance" and "Motorboat" on Illinois (1997) by Mila Drumke 
 "Frozen Charlotte" and "When They Ring the Golden Bells" on Ophelia (1998) by Natalie Merchant 
 "Do You Still Remember" on Davy Jones' Locker (1999) by The Ocean Blue 
 "The Places We've Been" on Ojalá (2017) by Lost Horizons 

Don has worked extensively with Lancaster-based singer-songwriter Denison Witmer, and was first credited as an engineer on his debut release, 1995's My Luck, My Love. He has gone on to produce several of Witmer's albums, including Safe Away (1998) and Are You a Dreamer? (2005), as well as the 1999 EP River Bends. He also engineered the LPs Of Sorrow and Joy (2001) and Recovered (2003), and mixed The '80s EP (2000) and Philadelphia Songs (2004). The latter album additionally features background vocals from Karen, on the song "Rock Run". Don also produced the 2003 charity album Poverty, Chastity, Obedience: Remembering Father Mychal F. Judge, O.F.M., and was credited as the mastering engineer for two EPs released by The Ocean Blue: Denmark (2000) and Ayn (2001). Mike Bitts and Steve Brown were both credited with performing bass guitar and drums, respectively, on several songs from Better Living Through Compression, a 2004 album by The Innocence Mission's former guitar technician Cliff Hillis.

Music videos

Notes
 signifies a track from a Don Peris solo album.
 signifies a track from a Karen Peris solo album.
 signifies a track that remains officially unreleased.
 "Rhode Island" was later re-recorded for My Room in the Trees, although the original 1996 recording remains unreleased.
 "Happy, the End" was originally released on Glow.
 "A Little Rain" is a Tom Waits cover; this is the only known performance of this song.
 "Do You See My Brothers Coming?" was later released as a bonus track on French editions of We Walked in Song.
 differs from the version which appeared on Brighter Visions Beam Afar.
 is identical to the version which previously appeared on Christ Is My Hope.

References

External links
Complete discography
Official discography
The Innocence Mission discography at AllMusic
The Innocence Mission discography at Discogs
The Innocence Mission discography at MusicBrainz

Discographies of American artists
Rock music group discographies